Annette Klug (born 24 January 1969) is a German fencer. She won a gold medal in the women's team foil event at the 1988 Summer Olympics.

References

External links
 

1969 births
Living people
German female fencers
Olympic gold medalists for West Germany
Fencers at the 1988 Summer Olympics
Olympic fencers of West Germany
Olympic medalists in fencing
Medalists at the 1988 Summer Olympics
People from Singen
Sportspeople from Freiburg (region)